Ezio Loik (26 September 1919 – 4 May 1949) was an Italian footballer who played as midfielder.

Born in Fiume, Loik began his career with Fiumana. He made his Serie A debut with Milan in 1937, and after three seasons, moved to Venezia. In Venice, he formed a notable partnership with Valentino Mazzola, and won the Coppa Italia in 1941. The following season, he moved to Torino, where he immediately won the domestic double and five consecutive Serie A titles.

At international level, Loik represented the Italy national team. He died in the 1949 Superga air disaster, along with the whole Grande Torino team.

Club career
Loik was born in Fiume (then part of Italy, current Rijeka, Croatia). He played as a midfielder, debuting for U.S. Fiumana aged 17 in the 1936–37 serie C tournament. After three seasons in Serie A with A.C. Milan, he moved to Venezia, where he obtained a third place and a Coppa Italia in 1941.

He moved to Torino in 1942, where he formed a notable midfield duo with Valentino Mazzola, who had also previously played for Venezia.

With the Grande Torino side, Loik won five consecutive Serie A scudetti and one further Coppa Italia (1942–43), until dying with most of the team in the Superga air disaster near Turin, on 4 May 1949, which also made up much of the Italy national team at the time.

International career
Loik was also capped nine times for the Italy national football team between 1942 and 1949, scoring four goals.

Honours
Venezia
Coppa Italia: 1940–41

Torino
Serie A: 1942–43, 1945–46, 1946–47, 1947–48, 1948–49
Coppa Italia: 1942–43

Individual
NK Rijeka all time XI

References

External links
Statistics at Enciclopedia del Calcio website 

1919 births
1949 deaths
Footballers from Rijeka
Italian footballers
Torino F.C. players
A.C. Milan players
Venezia F.C. players
Serie A players
Serie C players
Italy international footballers
U.S. Fiumana players
Association football midfielders
Footballers killed in the Superga air disaster